This page lists all appeals the Judicial Committee of the Privy Council from the Canadian courts, decided in the years 1867 to 1869.

Prior to the creation of Canada in 1867, the Judicial Committee of the Privy Council was the highest court of appeal for the British North American provinces.  That did not change after Confederation. Parties could continue to appeal to the Judicial Committee directly from the provincial appellate courts, as the Supreme Court of Canada was not created until 1875.  Even then, there continued to be a right of appeal to the Judicial Committee.  The decisions of the Judicial Committee on appeals from Canadian courts had binding legal precedent on all Canadian courts, including the Supreme Court, which was required to follow the cases of the Judicial Committee. The Judicial Committee decisions were the ultimate judicial authority for the Canadian courts and had a considerable influence on the development of Canadian law, particularly constitutional law.

List of cases

Summary by year and result

Summary by province

See also

 List of Canadian appeals to the Judicial Committee of the Privy Council, 1870–1879
 List of Canadian appeals to the Judicial Committee of the Privy Council, 1880–1889
 List of Canadian appeals to the Judicial Committee of the Privy Council, 1890–1899
 List of Canadian appeals to the Judicial Committee of the Privy Council, 1900–1909
 List of Canadian appeals to the Judicial Committee of the Privy Council, 1910–1919
 List of Canadian appeals to the Judicial Committee of the Privy Council, 1920–1929
 List of Canadian appeals to the Judicial Committee of the Privy Council, 1930–1939
 List of Canadian appeals to the Judicial Committee of the Privy Council, 1940–1949
 List of Canadian appeals to the Judicial Committee of the Privy Council, 1950–1959

Sources
 British and Irish Legal Information Institute:  Privy Council Decisions
 1867 Privy Council Decisions
 1868 Privy Council Decisions
 1869 Privy Council Decisions

References

1860s in Canada
Canadian case law lists
Canada